White River Township, Indiana may refer to one of the following places:

 White River Township, Gibson County, Indiana
 White River Township, Hamilton County, Indiana
 White River Township, Johnson County, Indiana
 White River Township, Randolph County, Indiana

See also

White River Township (disambiguation)

Indiana township disambiguation pages